Ide Anak Agung Gde Agung (Old Spelling: Ide Anak Agoeng Gde Agoeng; 21 July 1921 – 22 April 1999),  alternatively spelled too as Ida Anak Agung Gde Agung, was an Indonesian ethnic-Balinese politician, historian, and National Hero, who was the Raja of Gianyar, Bali, and served as the prime minister of the State of East Indonesia from 1947 to 1949, and the Foreign Affairs Minister of Indonesia from 1955 until 1956.

Born in Gianyar, Bali, on 21 July 1921, Ide Anak Agung Gde Agung was born to Raja Anak Gunung Ngurah Agung, the Raja of Gianyar. He obtained a doctorate degree at the University of Utrecht, the Netherlands, in the field of history. He served as the prime minister of the State of East Indonesia from 1947 to 1949. Following the independence of Indonesia, he served as Minister of Home Affairs and Minister of Foreign Affairs during the era of President Sukarno's administration. In addition, he has also served as the Indonesian Ambassador to Belgium, Portugal, France, and Austria.

Based on Presidential Decree No. 066/TK/2007, President Susilo Bambang Yudhoyono bestowed the title of National Hero to several national figures including Ida Anak Agung Gde Agung for his services in the struggle for Indonesian Independence, specifically for establishing and being the main driver of the Federal Consultative Assembly (PMF) in 1948, the association of federal states and territories in Indonesia aimed at gathering political power to overcome various Dutch-Indonesian negotiations.

Biography

Early life and education 

Ide Anak Agung Gde Agung was born in Gianyar, Bali, on 21 July 1921. He was the son of Raja Anak Gunung Ngurah Agung, the Raja of Gianyar. Since he was a small child, he was interested in history. He started his school education at the Hollandsche-Inlandsche School, the equivalent of elementary school. He then continued his education at Meer Uitgebreid Lagere Onderwijs (MULO), the equivalent of junior high school. After graduating from MULO, he continued his education at the Algemeene Middelbare School, the equivalent of high school. After that, he studied law at the Rechtshogeschool (The predecessor of the law faculty of the University of Indonesia), in Batavia (now Jakarta), and obtained a Doctorate of History in the Netherlands.

On 23 August 1943, a year after the Japanese invaded, Anak Agung became the Raja of Gianyar, a month after he celebrated his twenty-second birthday, making him only 22 years old. This was after his father was suspected and detained by the Japanese Ministry for treason.

Political career 

Anak Agung's role in politics began in the State of East Indonesia (NIT). He served as prime minister from December 1947 until December 1949. He also served as the premier for Tjokorda Gde Raka Soekawati, a key figure in the East Indonesian government based in Sulawesi. In this role, he played a decisive part in the Round Table Conference that finally led to Dutch recognition of Indonesia's independence.

Following the transfer of sovereignty on December 27, 1949, Agung served as a member of the short-lived Republic of the United States of Indonesia Cabinet, where he served as minister of the interior. Due to his Federalist sympathies, he politically feuded with Sukarno, who advocated a unitary Republic of Indonesia. Following the abolition of the federal system in 1950, he served as the Indonesian ambassador to Belgium, followed by successive appointments as ambassador to Luxembourg, Portugal, France and Austria. During the Sukarno presidency, Agung served as Indonesia's foreign minister between 1955 and 1956, and was a participant in the West New Guinea dispute. Later, he was imprisoned by the Sukarno regime between 1962 and 1966 but was never brought to trial.

Following the 1965 attempted coup and rise of Suharto's New Order regime, Ide Anak Agung Gde Agung was released by the new Indonesian foreign minister Adam Malik, who also restored him to his senior position in the Ministry of Foreign Affairs. During the New Order era, Agung served as Indonesia's ambassador to Austria. During his time overseas, Agung also authored Twenty years Indonesian foreign policy 1945–1965, a 660-page history of Indonesian foreign policy during the Sukarno era. In his book, Ide Anak Agung Gde Agung argued that Indonesian foreign policy was based on the principles of independence and action, which meant remaining independent of foreign powers. Agung also argued that Sukarno abandoned Indonesia's independent foreign policy by aligning Indonesia with China and embarking on a policy of confrontation against Malaysia.

Death and legacy 
Ida Anak Agung Gde Agung died in Gianyar, Bali, indonesia, on April 22, 1999. Based on Presidential Decree No. 066/TK/2007, President Susilo Bambang Yudhoyono bestowed the title of National Hero to several national figures, including Ida Anak Agung Gde Agung for his services in the struggle for Indonesian Independence, specifically for his services in 1948 in establishing and being the main driver of the Federal Consultative Assembly (PMF), the association of federal states and territories in Indonesia aimed at gathering political power to overcome various Dutch-Indonesian negotiations. He was also given the Bintang Mahaputra Adipradana award by the Indonesian government.

Writings

List of writings 
The following is a list of writings by Anak Agung.

References

Citations

Bibliography

Further reading 

 
 

Indonesian Hindu monarchs
Balinese people
1921 births
1999 deaths
Monarchs of Bali
Interior ministers of Indonesia
Foreign ministers of Indonesia
National Heroes of Indonesia
People from Gianyar Regency
Politicians from the State of East Indonesia
Ambassadors of Indonesia to Austria
Ambassadors of Indonesia to France
Ambassadors of Indonesia to Portugal